Eriphosoma marcela is a species of beetle in the family Cerambycidae. It was described by Napp and Monne in 2006.

References

Heteropsini
Beetles described in 2006